Nyang  may refer to:

Korean yang, also spelled nyang, the currency of Korea between 1892 and 1902
Nyang languages, a group of Southern Bantoid languages spoken in Southwest Cameroon

Places
Nyang River, a major river in south-west Tibet
Nyang Station, a sheep station in Western Australia

People with the surname
Aziz Corr Nyang (born 1984), Gambian footballer
Haggai Nyang', Kenyan Anglican bishop
Sulayman S. Nyang (1944–2018), Gambian professor of African studies

See also